The Love Album is a two-LP collection of previously recorded songs by Vinton, released in 1971 by Epic Records. This collection contains songs that are all about the subject of love. Only four singles are featured on this collection: "No Arms Can Ever Hold You", "Please Love Me Forever", "There! I've Said It Again" and "My Heart Belongs to Only You".

Track listing

Album credits
"This Guy's in Love With You", "Till", "For Once in My Life", "When I Fall in Love", "No Arms Can Ever Hold You", "Please Love Me Forever", "Love Me With All Your Heart", "To Think You've Chosen Me", "If I Didn't Care" and "It's All in the Game" produced by Billy Sherrill
"Sunrise, Sunset", "All", "The Shadow of Your Smile", "The End of the World" and "This Is My Song" produced, arranged and conducted by Robert Mersey
"From Russia With Love" produced by Bob Morgan
"This Guy's in Love With You" arranged by Bill Walker
"Till" and "For Once in My Life" arranged by Bill McElhiney
"There! I've Said It Again", "Too Young" and "Unchained Melody" arranged and conducted by Stan Applebaum

Love Album, The
Love Album, The
Albums produced by Billy Sherrill
Epic Records compilation albums